The Kurdistan National Congress (Kurdish: Kongreya Neteweyî ya Kurdistanê, KNC or KNK) is a multi-national platform of Kurdish groups and parties of all tendencies, which aims for the independence of Kurdistan. It was founded on 14 April 1985 on the initiative of the Kurdistan Workers' Party. It was inaugurated on 24 May 1999 in Brussels. The group has more recently be referred to as the Kurdistan National Congress in the Diaspora.

The convention of the KNC was endorsed on 26 May 1999, at the organization's founding assembly, and the scholar Ismet Cheriff Vanly was declared the first president. The convention was amended most recently at the ninth assembly which took place in December 2008.

Recently, conferences held by the group have reaffirmed their wish that Kurds may have their national identity recognized and the territory of Kurdistan be respected.

Composition 
The congress is constituted by 288 members for the term from October 2017 to October 2019.  

President of the KNC until at least 1999 was Najmaldin Karim. Two co-chairs of the KNK, Rebwar Rashed and Nilüfer Koç were elected to post on 27 September 2015 at the 15th General Meeting. Both were re-elected on 15 October 2017. In October 2019, Zainab Morad Sahrab and Ahmet Karamûs were elected for a term of two years. 

The KNK has several committees and commissions of which the commission for women is headed by Leyla Birlik  and the Law committee is headed by Zübeyir Aydar.

Criticism 
Kurdish affairs expert Michael Gunter reckoned that the KNC has had difficulty attracting wide participation from Kurdish people, and has appeared to be too close to the Kurdistan Workers Party (PKK).

Weblinks 
Official Webpage

References

1985 establishments in Turkey
Kurdish organisations
Kurdish political party alliances
Kurdistan Workers' Party
Political party alliances in Turkey